Events in the year 1968 in Sweden.

Incumbents
Monarch – Gustaf VI Adolf

Events
15 September – The 1968 Swedish general election is held.
28–29 September – The 1968 World Orienteering Championships are held in Linköping.

Births
January 12 - Anders Bagge.
May 8 - Annika Andersson.
November 25 - Mikael Martinsson.

Deaths
March 31 - Eivar Widlund.
November 16 - Carl Bertilsson.

Other
Socialist Solidarity Committee for Czechoslovakia formed in response to the Prague Spring.

References

 
Years of the 20th century in Sweden
1960s in Sweden
Sweden
Sweden